Pseudoconyza is a genus of flowering plants belonging to the family Asteraceae. It includes a singles species, Pseudoconyza viscosa.

Its native range is Tropics and Subtropics.

References

Inuleae
Monotypic Asteraceae genera